Lycuria or Lykouria was a village in ancient Arcadia, which marked the boundaries of the Pheneatae and Cleitorii.

Its site is tentatively located near the modern Lykouria, which was renamed to reflect association with the ancient town.

References

Populated places in ancient Arcadia
Former populated places in Greece